Diaper is a damask cloth with small patterns, mostly geometrical such as bird's eye or diamond shapes. Different kinds of diaper are referred to by special titles such as “bird’s-eye” or “pheasant’s-eye”; these terms denote the size of the diamond in the design of the cloth. The smaller pattern was named “bird’s-eye.” Diaper has been used as a tablecloth.

Bird eye pattern
Nightingale's eye pattern (bird's eye pattern, bird's eye, bulbul chashm) is a geometrical pattern of a diamond shape similar to the nightingale's eye used in various cloths such as silk and cotton.With its diagonal diamond woven with a dotted-eye in the middle, bulbul chashm ("chashm-e-bulbul") or nightingale's eye is a poetic name of the pattern.

Etymology 
The etymology of the term "diaper" traces back to the Latin word "diasper," which denotes rough and uneven texture. The word passed through the Low Latin term "diasperus," which referred to a particular type of cloth.

History 
“Diaper” refers to any small geometrical or floral pattern that consists of the constant repetition of one or more simple figure or units of design evenly spaced. The term was initially associated with silk with diamond patterns later applied to linen and cotton fabrics of similar designs.

Structure 
Diaper is made of linen and sometimes cotton or a combination of both.

More applications of bird eye pattern in textiles 
The design's versatility in terms of textile materials received praise, and several other applications associated with the bird's eye pattern are worth mentioning. These include:

Weave 
Silk fabrics with the bulbul design, made in Baghdad, were used in northern India in the 17th century. In these cloths, bulbul chrshum was woven with a yellow warp and a red weft, forming diamond patterns.

Khes weaving 
Check patterns (''charkhana'', chequered) and ''Bulbul chashm'' are renowned patterns in Khes weaving.

Sari 
A birds-eye pattern is used in saris, as well.

Embroidery 
The pattern is also used In embroidery art such as phulkari.

See also 

 Diapering is any of a wide range of decorative patterns used in a variety of works of art, such as stained glass, heraldic shields, architecture, and silverwork. Its chief use is in the enlivening of plain surfaces.

References 

Woven fabrics